Rob "The Dutchman" Kaman (born 5 June 1960) is a Dutch retired 9-time kickboxing and Muay Thai world champion. He is often called "Mr. Low Kick" because of his feared low kicks which he used to set up his devastating offensive attacks.

Biography

Young age
Rob Kaman was born in Amsterdam in 1960. In his early days, he played football for the AFC Ajax Youth Team. Kaman was a good player, but never liked team sports. At the age of 16, he became interested in martial arts and started training in pentjak silat an Indonesian style with Ruud van Weldam. After he watched a fight of kickboxer Lucien Carbin, he started training in Muay Thai and kickboxing at Mejiro Gym under Carbin and later Jan Plas when he was 19.

In 1980 Kaman became an A-class fighter in the Netherlands. He won most of his fights by K.O. The turning point for him was his fight with Blinky Rodriquez, the cousin of Benny Urquidez. Kaman knocked him out in the 2nd round with a low kick to the leg. That was his international breakthrough. From then on, Kaman started fighting in Thailand.

His first fight in Thailand was against Dennoi, a local champion. Kaman won by K.O. and was asked to fight Lakchart, a Thai champion, in Bangkok.

Winning world title
On 23 September 1983 he fought John Moncayo for the world title WKA of kickboxing. Kaman knocked him out in the 3rd round with a low kick and became the first European WKA world champion in kickboxing.

On 12 January 1984 he fought Payap Premchai, the champion of Thailand, in the Jaap Edenhal in Amsterdam and was declared the winner by unanimous decision.

In April 1984 he had a rematch with John Moncayo in Miami, Florida. This time he knocked Moncayo out with a punch in the 3rd round. At the end of that year he beat the great Thai fighter Samart Prasanmirt in Hong Kong as well as Jean Marc Tonus for the European title of full contact.

During the year 1985, he beat Larry McFadden in the 3rd round by a knockout and three months later he took his revenge on Lakchart. He knocked Lakchart out in the 4th round.

After that, Kaman fought many different fighters in Amsterdam: Ernest Simmons (WKA rules), Ernesto Hoost (WKA rules), Payap (rematch on Muay Thai rules), Roger Hurd (WKA rules) and Sittisak (Muay Thai rules). He won them all and at the end of 1987 the Japanese asked him to come fight in Japan.

His first fight in Japan was against Lakchart. Kaman knocked Lakchart out in the 1st round. From then on he fought many times in Japan. He fought against Kirkwood Walker, Hansu Premchai, Santiago Garza, and Don Nakaya Nielsen.

On 9 April 1989 Kaman fought in the Netherlands again against Jan Wessels from Arnhem. Kaman also organized that event and did not have the time to prepare properly for the fight. He lost the fight and many people thought that his career was over. At the end of the year, he came back and beat Wessels by knock out in the 2nd round for a WKA world title.

In 1989 Kaman played in the movie Bloodfist with Don Wilson and Billy Blanks and fought three times against Changpuek Kiatsongrit from Thailand and Eddy Matthieu from France. 
During the summer he had a fight in Japan against Peter Smit. Smit was a newcomer and a WKA European champion. Kaman became a father with the birth of his son Gaby just before the fight. Rob lost his world title.

Kaman came back again. He fought against the Japanese fighter Yoshinori Nishi in Japan and won by 1st round knock out. The promoters in the Netherlands matched him a super fight with the new upcoming fighter Ernesto Hoost. Before the fight Hoost was the favorite but Kaman managed to knock him out in the 5th round.

On 29 June 1991, Kaman fought against Luc Verheye in France for the world WKA title. Luc Verheye had beaten Peter Smit and was the new world champion. Kaman beat Luc Verheye and took the title back.

He fought in France against fighters such as Rick Roufus, Mark Russell, Justin Ward, and Zito Polyo. One of Kaman's best fights was against Marek Piotrowski, whom he beat by K.O. in the 7th round.

On 25 January 1992, Kaman challenged his first professional MMA bout in RINGS against Nobuaki Kakuda. He won by TKO with a knee shot to grounded opponent in 3rd round.

On 20 June, Rob fought "the fight of the fights" against Jean-Yves Thériault. Rob won the fight by TKO and became the new ISKA world champion. He was at the same time world champion in WKA kickboxing and world champion in Muay Thai.

On 26 November 1993 Rob fought against another great Dutch champion Rick V.D. Vathorst. Kaman knocked him out in the 2nd round.

After that he fought again in France, this time in Marseille, again against a newcomer from the Netherlands, Orlando Breinburg. He won by TKO in the 3rd round.

In 1995 he participated in the K-2 tournament in Paris, France. His first fight was against Lavelle Robinson and he won by KO. In his second fight, he fought the Australian Tosca Petridis and was the winner again. In the finals, after two fights that night, he went against Jerome Turcan from France. Rob was full of injuries from his previous fights. During round four, he was bleeding heavily but knocked Turcan out with two high kicks at the end of the round. After all his world titles, he also won the K-2 tournament in Paris, France.

After only a few fights in the later years, because of too many injuries and a new movie with Jean-Claude Van Damme (Legionnaire), Rob decided to end his career, back where it all started, in the Netherlands. On 24 October 1999, he fought for the last time, against Alexey Ignashov, a 21-year-old amateur world champion in kickboxing. Rob won the fight by points, but after the fight he said that his opponent was the real winner and gave his trophy to Ignashov.

Currently, he is training UFC light heavyweight Brandon Vera on kickboxing for MMA. He also trains MMA fighter Jason Miller.

Acting career
Towards the end of his sports career, Kaman tried his hand at acting, playing in three movies with Jean-Claude Van Damme, Legionnaire, Maximum Risk and Double Team with Dennis Rodman and Mickey Rourke. In 1993, Nikko Toshogu Press produced 8 videotapes on Muay Thai training with him and one videotape with highlights and knock outs of his career.

Prison sentence
In 1985, Kaman was sentenced to 18 months in prison for robbing a bank in Eindhoven on 28 May of the same year. Police arrested Kaman and a 22-year-old accomplice in Best, only 29 minutes after the robbery. The two carried out the robbery armed and masked and looted 9000 Dutch guilders.

Titles
1995 K-2 France Grand Prix '95 Champion
1992-94 I.S.K.A. Oriental Rules Light Heavyweight World Champion
1992 I.S.K.A. Full Contact Super Middleweight World Champion
1992 W.K.A. Full Contact Super Light Heavyweight World Champion
1990 I.M.T.F.(currently I.M.F.) Muay Thai Light Heavyweight World Champion
1989-90 W.K.A. Full Contact Light Heavyweight World Champion
1988-89 W.K.A. Full Contact Light Heavyweight World Champion
1984 P.K.A. Full Contact European Champion
1983-87 W.K.A. Full Contact Middleweight World Champion
I.K.B.F. Full Contact Light Heavyweight World Champion

Fight record

|-
|-  bgcolor="#CCFFCC"
| 1999-10-24 || Win ||align=left| Alexey Ignashov || It's Showtime - It's Showtime || Haarlem, Netherlands || Decision || 5 || 3:00
|-
|-  bgcolor="#FFBBBB"
| 1996-12-08 || Loss ||align=left| Jean-Claude Leuyer || K-1 Hercules '96 || Nagoya, Japan || TKO (shin injury) || 5 || 0:43
|-
|-  bgcolor="#CCFFCC"
| 1995-09-30 || Win ||align=left| Bunshima Roong || Kickboxing Mania III || Milan, Italy || KO (Elbow) || ||
|-
|-  bgcolor="#c5d2ea"
| 1995-06-24 || No Contest ||align=left| Tosca Petridis || || Paris, France || No Contest || ||
|-
! style=background:white colspan=9 |
|-
|-  bgcolor="#CCFFCC"
| 1995-01-07 || Win ||align=left| Jerome Turcan || K-2 France Grand Prix '95 Final || Paris, France || Ext.R KO (High Kick) || 4 ||
|-
! style=background:white colspan=9 |
|-
|-  bgcolor="#CCFFCC"
| 1995-01-07 || Win ||align=left| Tosca Petridis || K-2 France Grand Prix '95 Semi Finals || Paris, France || Decision || 3 || 3:00
|-
|-  bgcolor="#CCFFCC"
| 1995-01-07 || Win ||align=left| Lavelle Robinson || K-2 France Grand Prix '95 Quarter Finals || Paris, France || KO (Low Kick) || 1 || 2:35
|-
|-  bgcolor="#CCFFCC"
| 1994-11-12 || Win ||align=left| Orlando Breienburg || Thriller in Marseille || Marseille, France || TKO || 3 ||
|-
|-  bgcolor="#CCFFCC"
| 1994-06-25 || Win ||align=left| Jerome Turcan || || Paris, France || KO (Low Kicks)|| ||
|-
! style=background:white colspan=9 |
|-
|-  bgcolor="#FFBBBB"
| 1994-02-05 || Loss ||align=left| Rick Roufus || || Paris, France || KO (Left Hook) || 2 ||
|-
! style=background:white colspan=9 |
|-
|-  bgcolor="#FFBBBB"
| 1993-12-29 || Loss ||align=left| Changpuek Kiatsongrit || K-2 Grand Prix '93 Quarter Finals || Tokyo, Japan || Decision (Unanimous) || 3 || 3:00
|-
|-  bgcolor="#CCFFCC"
| 1993-11-26 || Win ||align=left| Rick van der Vathorst || Thaiboxing gala, Houtrusthallen|| The Hague, Netherlands || KO (Right hook + Left mid kick) || 2 ||
|-
|-  bgcolor="#CCFFCC"
| 1993-06-05 || Win ||align=left| Matthias Weitz || || Paris, France || KO || ||
|-
|-  bgcolor="#CCFFCC"
| 1992-12-11 || Win ||align=left| Adam Watt || || Tokyo, Japan || KO (Left Hook) || 2||
|-
|-  bgcolor="#CCFFCC"
| 1992-11-21 || Win ||align=left| Marek Piotrowski || || Paris, France || TKO (Right Cross)|| 7 ||
|-
! style=background:white colspan=9 |
|-
|-  bgcolor="#c5d2ea"
| 1992-08-21 || Draw ||align=left| Masaaki Satake || Rings Event "Ishizue" || Tokyo, Japan || Decision Draw || 5 || 3:00
|-
|-  bgcolor="#CCFFCC"
| 1992-06-20 || Win ||align=left| Jean-Yves Thériault || || Paris, France || TKO (Gave Up) || 5 || 2:00
|-
! style=background:white colspan=9 |
|-
|-  bgcolor="#FFBBBB"
| 1992-04-26 || Loss ||align=left| Sadaw Kiatsongrit || || Bangkok, Thailand || Decision || 5 || 3:00
|-
|-  bgcolor="#CCFFCC"
| 1992-04-? || Win ||align=left| Justin Ward || || Paris, France || KO || ||
|-
|-  bgcolor="#CCFFCC"
| 1992-03-26 || Win ||align=left| Adam Watt || Kakutogi Symposium || Tokyo, Japan || KO  || ||
|-
|-  bgcolor="#CCFFCC"
| 1992-02-09 || Win ||align=left| Mark Russell || || Paris, France || KO (Right Cross)|| 2 ||
|-
! style=background:white colspan=9 |
|-
|-  bgcolor="#CCFFCC"
| 1992-01-07 || Win ||align=left| Lavelle Robinson || || Paris, France || KO || ||
|-
|-  bgcolor="#c5d2ea"
| 1991-12-20 || No Contest ||align=left| Rick Roufus || Les Choc Des Geants || Paris, France || No Contest || 12 || 2:00
|-
! style=background:white colspan=9 |
|-
|-  bgcolor="#CCFFCC"
| 1991-10-25 || Win ||align=left| Zijad Poljo || Thriller from Paris II || Paris, France || TKO (Corner stoppage/towel) || 4 ||
|-
|-  bgcolor="#CCFFCC"
| 1991-06-29 || Win ||align=left| Luc Verheye || Thriller from Paris I || Paris, France || TKO (Doctor stoppage/eye injury) || 5 || 1:36
|-
! style=background:white colspan=9 |
|-
|-  bgcolor="#CCFFCC"
| 1990-11-18 || Win ||align=left| Ernesto Hoost || The Battle of the Year || Amsterdam, Netherlands || KO (Left Hook) || 5 ||
|-
|-  bgcolor="#CCFFCC"
| 1990-09-28 || Win ||align=left| Yoshinori Nishi || A.J.K.F Inspiring Wars "Heat-928" || Tokyo, Japan || KO (Right Hook) || 1 || 1:51
|-
|-  bgcolor="#FFBBBB"
| 1990-06-30 || Loss ||align=left| Peter Smit || A.J.K.F Inspiring Wars "Heat-630" || Tokyo, Japan || KO (Punches)|| 10 ||
|-
! style=background:white colspan=9 |
|-
|-  bgcolor="#CCFFCC"
| 1990-05-27 || Win ||align=left| Eddy Matthieu || Holland vs Thailand || Amsterdam, Netherlands || KO (Left Hook to the Body) || 1 ||
|-
! style=background:white colspan=9 |
|-
|-  bgcolor="#FFBBBB"
| 1990-04-24 || Loss ||align=left| Changpuek Kiatsongrit || Holland Goes to Thailand, Lumpinee Stadium || Bangkok, Thailand || Decision || 5 || 3:00
|-
! style=background:white colspan=9 |
|-
|-  bgcolor="#CCFFCC"
| 1990-03-31 || Win ||align=left| Dominique Siegler || || Tokyo, Japan || KO (Left Hook) || 1 ||
|-
|-  bgcolor="#CCFFCC"
| 1990-02-18 || Win ||align=left| Changpuek Kiatsongrit || Holland vs Thailand 1990 || Amsterdam, Netherlands || KO (Left Hook) || 5 ||
|-
! style=background:white colspan=9 |
|-
|-  bgcolor="#FFBBBB"
| 1989-12-31 || Loss ||align=left| Changpuek Kiatsongrit || || Paris, France || Decision || 5 || 3:00
|-
|-  bgcolor="#CCFFCC"
| 1989-11-19 || Win ||align=left| Jan Wessels || Kaman vs Wessels, Jaap Edenhal|| Amsterdam, Netherlands || KO (Right Cross) || 2 ||
|-
! style=background:white colspan=9 |
|-
|-  bgcolor="#f7f6a8"
| 1989-10-21 || Exhibition||align=left| Samson Negro || A.J.K.F Clash Of The Century, Part 5 || Tokyo, Japan || KO  || 3 ||
|-
|-  bgcolor="#CCFFCC"
| 1989-09-05 || Win ||align=left| Don Nakaya Nielsen || A.J.K.F Super Bout || Tokyo, Japan || KO (Right Hook) || 3 ||
|-
|-  bgcolor="#FFBBBB"
| 1989-04-09 || Loss ||align=left| Jan Wessels || || Netherlands || KO || ||
|-
! style=background:white colspan=9 |
|-
|-  bgcolor="#CCFFCC"
| 1988-11-25 || Win ||align=left| Sean O'Regan || A.J.K.F "Fighting The Great War 5" || Japan || KO (Left Hook)|| 2 ||
|-
|-  bgcolor="#CCFFCC"
| 1988-10-25 || Win ||align=left| Ghalib Carmichael || A.J.K.F "Fighting The Great War 4" || Tokyo, Japan || KO (Right Low Kick) || 3 ||
|-
|-  bgcolor="#CCFFCC"
| 1988-07-16 || Win ||align=left| Santiago Garza || A.J.K.F "Fighting The Great War 3" || Japan || KO (Right Low Kick) || 3 ||
|-
! style=background:white colspan=9 |
|-
|-  bgcolor="#CCFFCC"
| 1988-05-29 || Win ||align=left| Hansu Premchai || A.J.K.F "Fighting The Great War 2" || Japan || KO (Right Cross) || 1 ||
|-
|-  bgcolor="#CCFFCC"
| 1988-03-12 || Win ||align=left| Kirkwood Walker || A.J.K.F "Fighting The Great War" || Japan || KO (Low Kicks and punches) || 4 ||
|-
! style=background:white colspan=9 |
|-  bgcolor="#FFBBBB"
| 1988-02-06 || Loss ||align=left| Krongsak Sakcharoenchai || || Paris, France || Decision || 5 || 3:00
|-
! style=background:white colspan=9 |

|-  bgcolor="#CCFFCC"
| 1987-11-15 || Win ||align=left| Lakchart Sor.Prasartporn || A.J.K.F "Super Fight 3" || Japan || KO (Body Straight) || 1 || 0:30
|-
|-  bgcolor="#CCFFCC"
| 1987 || Win ||align=left| Sittisak || || Amsterdam, Netherlands || || ||

|-  bgcolor="#CCFFCC"
| 1987-05-31 || Win ||align=left| Payap Premchai ||  || Amsterdam, Netherlands || KO (Left hook to the body) || 5 || 
|-
|-  bgcolor="#CCFFCC"
| 1987-02-01 || Win ||align=left| Ernesto Hoost || W.K.A. Kickboxing || Amsterdam, Netherlands || Decision (Unanimous) || 5 || 2:00
|-
|-  bgcolor="#CCFFCC"
| 1986-10-12 || Win ||align=left| Ernest Simmons || W.K.A. Kickboxing || Amsterdam, Netherlands || TKO (Corner Stoppage/Low Kicks) || 5||2:00
|-
|-  bgcolor="#CCFFCC"
| 1986 || Win ||align=left| Roger Hurd || W.K.A. Kickboxing || Amsterdam, Netherlands || KO (Right Low Kick) || 1 ||
|-
|-  bgcolor="#CCFFCC"
| 1985-05-12 || Win ||align=left| Lakchart Sor.Prasartporn || Kickboxing in Jaap Edenhal || Amsterdam, Netherlands || KO || 4 ||
|-
|-  bgcolor="#CCFFCC"
| 1985-02-03 || Win ||align=left| Larry McFadden || W.K.A. Kickboxing || Amsterdam, Netherlands || KO (Right Low Kick) || 3 ||
|-
! style=background:white colspan=9 |
|-
|-  bgcolor="#CCFFCC"
| 1984-12-30 || Win ||align=left| Samart Prasarnmit ||  || Hong Kong || KO (Left hook to the body) || 2 ||
|-
|-  bgcolor="#CCFFCC"
| 1984 || Win ||align=left| Jean Marc Tonus || P.K.A. Kickboxing || Geneva, Switzerland || || ||
|-
! style=background:white colspan=9 |
|-
|-  bgcolor="#CCFFCC"
| 1984-03-29  || Win ||align=left| John Moncayo || W.K.A. Kickboxing || Miami, Florida, USA || KO (Punch) || 3 ||
|-
! style=background:white colspan=9 |
|-
|-  bgcolor="#CCFFCC"
| 1984-01-12 || Win ||align=left| Payap Premchai ||  || Amsterdam, Netherlands || Decision (Unanimous) || 5 || 3:00
|-
|-  bgcolor="#CCFFCC"
| 1983-09-23 || Win ||align=left| John Moncayo || W.K.A. Kickboxing || Amsterdam, Netherlands || KO (Low Kick) || 3 ||
|-
! style=background:white colspan=9 |
|-
|-  bgcolor="#FFBBBB"
| 1983 || Loss ||align=left| Wade Woodbury ||  || Bangkok, Thailand || Decision (Unanimous) || ||
|-
|-  bgcolor="#CCFFCC"
| 1983 || Win ||align=left| Dennoi ||  || Thailand || KO || ||
|-
|-  bgcolor="#CCFFCC"
| 1982-10-23 || Win ||align=left| Tuncay Coban ||  || Amsterdam, Netherlands || KO || ||
|-
! style=background:white colspan=9 |
|-
|-  bgcolor="#CCFFCC"
| 1982-04-04 || Win ||align=left| Blinky Rodriquez || W.K.A. Kickboxing, Holland vs USA  || Netherlands || KO (Low Kick) || 2 ||
|-
|-  bgcolor="#fbb"
| 1982-01-23 || Loss ||align=left| Lakchart Sor.Prasatporn || || Bangkok, Thailand || Decision || 5 || 3:00
|-  bgcolor="#CCFFCC"
| 1981-05-03 || Win ||align=left| Takayuki Morimoto || W.K.A. Kickboxing, Holland vs Japan  || Amsterdam, Netherlands || KO (Punches) || 2 ||
|-
|-  bgcolor="#CCFFCC"
| 1980-09-28 || Win ||align=left| Akira Saito ||   || Netherlands ||  KO ||1 ||
|-  bgcolor="#CCFFCC"
| 1980-04-28 || Win ||align=left| Serge Metz ||   || Rotterdam, Netherlands ||  || ||
|-
|-  bgcolor="#CCFFCC"
| 1979-12-27 || Win ||align=left| Madourgh ||   || Rotterdam, Netherlands ||  || ||
|-
|-  bgcolor="#FFBBBB"
| 1978-10-? || Loss ||align=left| Carilon || || Paris, France || Decision || ||
|-
|-
| colspan=9 | Legend:

Professional boxing record

MMA record

|-
|-  bgcolor="#CCFFCC"
| 1992-01-25 || Win ||align=left| Nobuaki Kakuda || Rings Battle Dimensions Tournament, Opening Round || Tokyo, Japan || TKO (Knee Drop) || 3 || 2:03
|-
|-
|-
| colspan=9 | Legend:

See also
List of male kickboxers

References

Living people
1960 births
Dutch male kickboxers
Middleweight kickboxers
Light heavyweight kickboxers
Dutch Muay Thai practitioners
Dutch male mixed martial artists
Mixed martial artists utilizing Muay Thai
Mixed martial artists utilizing silat
Kickboxing trainers
Sportspeople from Amsterdam